Lotteria may mean:

Lotteria, a fast-food chain
Gran Premio Lotteria, a horse-racing event often called the Lotteria
Lotería, a Latino board game played with cards